Daniel Rozoum (20 May 1959 – 28 February 2013), known as Daniel Darc, was a French singer, who achieved success with his band Taxi Girl (together with Mirwais Ahmadzaï) between 1978 and 1986, and also as a solo artist.

After Taxi Girl was disbanded in 1986, he continued a solo career, releasing Sous influence divine in 1987. Produced by Jacno, this included a cover version of "Comment te dire adieu", a song with lyrics by Serge Gainsbourg that had been popularized by Françoise Hardy. In 1994 he released Nijinsky, followed by two albums in cooperation with composer, director and producer Frédéric Lo: Crève cœur in 2004 and then Amours suprêmes in 2008, with appearances by Alain Bashung, Robert Wyatt, Morgane (singer of Cocoon) and Steve Nieve. The title of the latter album is a reference to "A Love Supreme" by John Coltrane.

The last album released while he was alive was La Taille de mon âme in 2011. Darc died on 28 February 2013. He was 53.

Some of his materials were released posthumously in 2013 under the title Chapelle Sixteen

Discography

Albums
With Taxi Girl
 1980: Cherchez le garçon
 1981: Seppuku
 1983: Quelqu'un comme toi
 1983: Suite & fin ?
 1990: 84–86
 1990: Quelque part dans Paris

Solo

Compilation albums
 2003: Le Meilleur de Daniel Darc

Collaborations
 1988: Parce que, concept album with Bill Pritchard (with a song written by Charles Aznavour – the title track – and an adaptation of "Stephany Says" – song of Velvet Underground)
 1988: "La Ville", single produced by Etienne Daho
 1993: "Les Champs-Élysées" in L’Équipe à Jojo – Les chansons de Joe Dassin, collective tribute album by Le Village Vert
 1997: writes  "Las, dans le ciel" and "Ne laisse pas le jour" for Marie-France (Garcia)
 1998: 18/12, with 19 torsions (Jean-Paul Fourgeot, Gaultier Machart and Jean Lodereau)
 2002: writes "Ghost" for Brent (album Platinum Deadstar)
 2004: sings on "Jeunesse éternelle" by Operation S
 2005: "She's so untouchable" in Tribute to Johnny Thunders
 2005: "Rondeau" in On dirait, tribute album to Nino Ferrer
 2005: "Pauvre garçon", duet with Cali in Menteur
 2005: "Comme des papillons", duet with Buzy in Borderlove
 2005: "Mes amis", duet with Jane Birkin in Rendez-vous avec Jane
 2006: "Comme disait l'ami Johnny Rotten", written and duet with Patrick Eudeline in Mauvaise étoile
 2006: writes for Tchéky Karyo
 2006: writes "Cœur Sacré" for Thierry Amiel
 2006: writes "Ca ne sert à rien d'aimer" for Elisa Tovati, in Je ne mâche pas mes mots
 2007: Les Aventuriers d'un autre Monde, tour with Jean-Louis Aubert, Alain Bashung, Cali,  and Raphael
 2007: writes for Alizée
 2008: "Promesses", duet with Frédéric Lo in Tombés pour Daho, tribute to Étienne Daho
 2008: "Chercher le garçon", duet with Superbus in TV show Taratata
 2009: "O Caroline" in Around Robert Wyatt
 2009: "La Romance des Cruels", duet with Nosfell
 2009: "Pas pour moi" in On n'est pas là pour se faire engueuler, tribute album to Boris Vian

See also
Mirwais Ahmadzaï
Taxi Girl

References

External links

Official Daniel Darc Web Site
Official Taxi-Girl Web Site

1959 births
2013 deaths
French pop singers
Musicians from Paris
20th-century French  male singers